Sleep of Reason is the debut album from English musician Raffertie. It was released in August 2013 under Ninja Tune Records.

Track listing

References

2013 debut albums
Ninja Tune albums